The Budapest–Belgrade–Skopje–Athens railway, a China-CEE hallmark project (2014) of Beijing’s Belt and Road initiative, is a planned railroad international connection in Central and Southeast Europe – between Budapest (Hungary), Belgrade (Serbia), Skopje (North Macedonia), Athens and its China-run port of Piraeus (Greece). The Chinese planners do not comment on the other tracks' realizable speeds. Originally, they spoke of up to  throughout.

Modernization of the Serbian section 
In Serbia (some ), one of the segments, the -long section Belgrade-Stara Pazova was reconstructed by China Communications Construction Company (CCCC) together with China Railways International (CRI), with the investment of $350.1 million, funded with a loan from the Export-Import Bank of China. The section Stara Pazova-Novi Sad is being reconstructed by the Russian RZD International, financed with Russian credit. The section between Belgrade and Novi Sad was opened on 19 March 2022.

The reconstruction of the 108 km section Novi Sad-Subotica (Hungarian border) was set to begin in 2019, with estimated cost of €943 million, built by CCCC and a duration of 33 months, requiring the closure of this section during the reconstruction time. It actually started on 7 April 2022 and is due to be completed for the end of 2024.

In July 2020, President Aleksandar Vučić announced that the 204 km Belgrade-Niš section will be completed by the end of 2023. It will have speeds of up to 200 km/h (124 mph), bringing Belgrade and Niš within 1 hour and 20 minutes of each other. It will follow the direction of the Pan-European Corridor X. On 10 May 2021, a loan agreement was signed in Belgrade for 102 million euros, co-financed by the French Development Agency and the World Bank at 51 million euros each, planned to be used for the complete modernization of the Belgrade-Niš railway, where trains will be able to reach speeds of up to 200 km/h on about 56% of the railway.

EU planning 

Moreover, there are also a number of technical advantages of this proposed part of the Balkan route: 89% of it is electrified, as against 75% of the present PP22 route and the tracks are designed for higher maximum speeds overall. Nevertheless 64% of the planned line is still single track, compared to 54% of the present part of the PP22 route.

The planners appeal to the politicians: "In the medium term it may become necessary to tailor priorities in line with what is feasible, both for the European Union, the main provider of funding, and the Member States concerned. In this respect, Croatia’s accession to the European Union in July 2013 and discussions with the [r]epublics of the former Yugoslavia in connection with the review of TEN–T policy present a useful opportunity to develop rail links between south–east and central Europe via the western Balkans."

See also 
 Trans-European Transport Networks (TEN-T)
 Budapest–Belgrade railway
 Balkan Express (train)
 Bosphorus Express
 Friendship Express

References

International railway lines
Rail transport in North Macedonia
Rail infrastructure in Greece
Rail infrastructure in Hungary
Rail infrastructure in Serbia
Proposed transport infrastructure in Greece
Proposed transport infrastructure in Hungary
Proposed transport infrastructure in Serbia
High-speed trains